Perry Crofts is a housing estate in Tamworth, Staffordshire, England, built in the 1970s. It is a small suburb consisting of brick and wood houses. The closest school to Perry Crofts is Landau Forte Academy QEMS.

Housing estates in England
Areas of Tamworth, Staffordshire